Bonnanaro is a comune (municipality) in the Province of Sassari in the Italian region Sardinia, located about  north of Cagliari and about  southeast of Sassari.

Bonnanaro borders the following municipalities: Bessude, Borutta, Mores, Siligo, Torralba.

References

External links
Official website

Cities and towns in Sardinia